Akinola Aguda (1923 – 5 September 2001) was a Yoruba Nigerian jurist and a former Chief Justice of Botswana. Prior to becoming Chief Justice, he was a lawyer and a High Court judge in Nigeria's Western Region. He was the first indigenous African to head the position of Chief Justice in Botswana.

Throughout his legal career, he was known as a cerebral jurist and lawyer, who embraced radicalism especially during period of military rule in Nigeria. It is believed this may have resulted in his exclusion as a member of the supreme court of Nigeria.

Early life and education
Judge Aguda was born in Akure, Nigeria, to the family of Elijah Aguda and Deborah Fasu, a prominent Anglican couple in Akure. He studied at St David's Primary School, Akure, for primary education and left for the Government College, Ibadan for secondary education. Originally, he wanted to be a doctor or an engineer but his mind was not quite into chemistry, a crucial subject necessary to pass medical school. He left medical school after the first year and tried teaching but on the advice of Obafemi Awolowo, he changed his mind and decided to enrol in a Law school. He studied Law at the University of London, and was called to the bar in 1952.

Career
After completing his studies, he entered private practice in the chambers of the distinguished Nigerian lawyer, Ayo Rosiji. but later transferred to the legal department of the western region of Nigeria, and became the Pupil Crown Counsel. Soon thereafter, he was made Crown Counsel in 1955 and in 1968, he became the acting solicitor general of the Western region. On 3 February 1972 he was appointed the first African Chief Justice of Botswana, concurrently, he was also a judge of the Court of Appeal of Swaziland, Botswana and Lesotho. After, leaving the supreme court in 1975, he returned to Nigeria and continued his judicial career as Chief Judge of Ondo State. In 1976, he was a leading member of the committee that recommended Abuja as the capital of Nigeria. He retired from civil service in 1978 and became the director of the newly created Nigerian Institute of Advanced Legal Studies at the University of Lagos. As director of the Nigerian Institute of Advanced Legal Studies, Aguda assumed a new role, as a critic of corruption and governance in Nigeria and Africa. To Aguda, the lack of thorough knowledge of judicial norms and precedents by the common African man or woman leads to the abuse of vital human rights by the government. A situation that can be fuelled by poverty, which allows many to rot in jails without due process or even a notice of trial as they do not have the money to get an astute lawyer or the connections to effect changes to their situation. His defence of the right of suspects was a crucial issue that was prominent during his days as a judge. In 1968, in the case of Agbaje vs the Western Government of Nigeria, he wrote a comment that is still relevant in today's Nigerian judicial system.    He also sought for removal of economic barriers in the criminal justice system, concurrently with a speedy trial and to put omnipotent leaders under the law not above it.

Personal life
He married his first wife in 1952 and took on a mistress two years after.

References

1923 births
2001 deaths
People from Akure
Alumni of the University of London
Nigerian judges
Nigerian judges on the courts of Botswana
Nigerian judges on the courts of Lesotho
Nigerian judges on the courts of Eswatini
Government College, Ibadan alumni
Yoruba legal professionals
Academic staff of the University of Lagos
20th-century Nigerian lawyers
Nigerian expatriates in the United Kingdom